Çal Karası is a variety of red wine grape from the Çal district of the Denizli Province of western Turkey. It also gives its name to a wine produced from the grape, which is sweet with berry fruit flavours.

History
A local selection in an area that has been growing vines for thousands of years, the origins are probably in ancient times.

Distribution and wines

Turkey
Çal Karası is only found in the mountains around Gömce village. The wines are around 12 - 13% alcohol, with 5-7 grams/litre acidity. It is a good match with any kind of aperitif together with fruits, pastries, cheese (Roquefort).

Vine and viticulture
The fact that it comes from Turkey suggests that it is adapted to harsh climates.

See also
 Boğazkere
 Kalecik Karası
 Öküzgözü
 Papazkarası

References

Grape varieties of Turkey
Denizli Province
Turkish words and phrases
Red wine grape varieties